Åse Lill Kimestad (born 16 August 1955) is a Norwegian politician for the Labour Party.

She served as a deputy representative to the Norwegian Parliament from Vest-Agder during the terms 1989–1993, 1993–1997 and 2001–2005.

On the local level, Kimestad became the mayor of Mandal municipality in a direct election in 2003. She lost her position following the 2007 elections.

References

1955 births
Living people
Deputy members of the Storting
Labour Party (Norway) politicians
Mayors of places in Vest-Agder
Women members of the Storting
Women mayors of places in Norway